The Rolls-Royce Phantom IV is a British automobile produced by Rolls-Royce. Only eighteen were made between 1950 and 1956, sold only to buyers whom Rolls-Royce considered worthy of the distinction: the British royal family and heads of state. Sixteen are known to still exist in museums as well as in public and private collections.

Characteristics

Rolls-Royce broke with their earlier decision to cease production of the series of "big" Rolls-Royce Phantoms after the end of World War II. The Phantom IV chassis differed from those of the shorter, production post-War models, the Silver Wraith and the Bentley Mark VI; apart from a larger size and an engine with increased capacity and power, they have an additional cross-member at the centre of the cruciform bracing and 10-stud road wheel mountings.

The engine was a derivative of the 8-cylinder rationalized B range of petrol engines (formed by four, six and straight eight). Specifically it was a refined version of a B80, the last three of a B81, both used in military and commercial vehicles. The IV is the only Rolls-Royce motorcar to be fitted with a straight-8 engine, which was powerful but could also run long distances at a very low speed, an important feature for ceremonial and parade cars.

All examples of this exclusive series were bodied by independent coachbuilders, and most of their bonnets surmounted by the kneeling version of the Spirit of Ecstasy, which had been unveiled in 1934 and used in various other models.

History

In July 1938, Rolls-Royce had to publish in the motoring press an announcement denying that the Phantom III fabrication would be interrupted. The following was published on 19 July 1938 in the British magazine The Motor:

However, a project had been initiated in 1937 to rein in the manufacturing costs of the Rolls-Royce and Bentley (acquired by Rolls-Royce in 1931) motor car chassis. This involved the development of a Rationalized Range of cars that shared as many common components of the chassis as possible. As implementation of this rationalization plan, several prototypes were made. One of these, chassis 30-G-VII, was fitted with a large Park Ward seven-seater limousine body and was called Silver Wraith 80, then Silver Phantom, though it soon became known as Big Bertha. This was the genesis of the Phantom IV.

Likewise, in 1939 and before the starting of hostilities, another straight-eight powered experimental automobile tested during and after World War II was a special Bentley Mark V, chassis 11-B-V, fitted with a bored-out 6.3 litre eight-cylinder engine. Although the official Experimental Department name for this car was Comet, its scorching performance earned it the fond epithet Scalded Cat. This unit in particular would later play a key role in the decision of creating the Phantom IV. Indeed, the Duke of Edinburgh heard about the Bentley nicknamed Scalded Cat in 1948 and asked if he might test it out. He enjoyed this experimental car immensely and drove it for considerable distances. When he returned it, he apparently murmured about how nice it would be to have a car with performance in the Royal Mews.

On 15 November 1948, not long after Prince Philip had driven the aforementioned automobile, an order came through for a Rolls-Royce motor car for Princess Elizabeth and Prince Philip. They placed the order through The Car Mart, Ltd., RR official retailers. Such a vehicle would have to meet their official needs, which meant it must be a limousine. It would also have to have good performance, since the Prince wished to drive it himself. The car would be the first Rolls-Royce in the stables. It was originally planned to be the only Phantom IV, a strictly one-off piece.

Rolls-Royce, aware that Daimler had held the royal warrant to provide motor cars since 1900, was very keen to ensure that the car was the best there had ever been, and a great deal of hand work was lavished on the construction of the chassis. The board members had earlier considered making a replacement for the pre-war Phantom III, but they were wary that such a large and expensive car might not have a market in the weak post-war economy. Production of the first two units of the new model was not at Crewe, but at the experimental Clan Foundry at Belper, which had been the home of the motor car branch during the Second World War. The experimental department still continued there until the closure of Clan Foundry in 1950, when it was finally transferred to Crewe.

The chassis 4AF2 was built under the code-name Nabha, and Mulliner was selected as the coachbuilder, so they prepared drawings for approval. The chassis was delivered to them on 20 July 1949 for erection of the body. Prince Philip visited the workshops more than once while it was being built. When the automobile was completed in July 1950, its delivery was accompanied by a public announcement stating the Phantom IV had been "designed to the special order of Their Royal Highnesses, the Princess Elizabeth and the Duke of Edinburgh".

As the car was privately owned when delivered to the couple, it was painted Valentine green (deep green with a slight blue secondary hue) with red belt-line striping. The limousine became an official state car of the United Kingdom upon Princess Elizabeth's accession to the throne in 1952; as such, it was repainted in the sovereign's colour scheme of royal claret and black.

This car remains in the Royal Mews and is still used occasionally for royal and state events. For example, it was used at the wedding of Prince William and Catherine Middleton in 2011 to carry Prince Charles and Camilla, Duchess of Cornwall, from Clarence House to Westminster Abbey. In 2018, it brought Meghan Markle to St George's Chapel, Windsor Castle, for her wedding to Prince Harry. In 2022, it transported the new king, Charles III, and the Queen Consort from Buckingham Palace to Westminster Hall and RAF Northolt.

The Spanish order

On 18 October 1948, Crewe received an order from the Government of Spain for three armoured cars for the use of Generalissimo Francisco Franco: two with limousine bodies and an open all-weather body; this one intended to replace a 1936 Hispano-Suiza J12 with Carrosserie Vanvooren body. While the Phantom IV model was not specified in the order, or even known outside the company at that time, it was decided that the best way to cope with the huge additional weight would be to build the three cars as Phantom IVs, rather than over-burden the Silver Wraith chassis. Especially since the Foreign Office suggested that Crewe could not turn down the order.

The passengers were to be immune from a Mauser bullet fired at ten paces, so W. A. Robotham recommended a body from Mulliner’s of Chiswick, which "had many satisfied customers among the more unpopular rulers of the world". A mission to Mulliner’s of Army officers required glass one and three quarters of an inch thick and armour plate. The armour plate was to be almost half an inch thick, and the large floor area required would make the completed weight of the cars over three and a half tons, which would overstress the wheels and gearbox on Spain's main roads. Some years later when holidaying there, Robotham inspected the cars; the brigadier in charge of the garage praised them and said they were used frequently. The speedometers only showed less than 2,000 km but "they were taken by train and only driven for the actual inspections and processions". 

Without intending it, the Government of Spain's triple order (along with the later Duke's commission) probably helped to give a decisive impulse to the existence of this model, as suggested by Martin Bennett in his book Rolls-Royce & Bentley: The Crewe Years and the number 9 September 1990 of the British magazine Classic Cars. All these three historical vehicles are property of the Spanish Army and are still in ceremonial use for the Spanish royal family.

The "Royalty and Heads of State only" policy

It is not known exactly when the "Royalty and Heads of State only" policy was decided, nor indeed whether in fact there was such an explicit company policy. It is known though, that a boardroom decision was reached that it would be impractical and disruptive to production of standard models to attempt to build more than three Phantom IVs per year. It is also clear that no private customer other than royalty and heads of state ever took delivery of a Phantom IV. Nevertheless, a considerable number of coachbuilder's drawings exist of proposed Phantom IVs that never were built.

A number of these are proposals by coachbuilders for chassis which in the event were bodied by other coachbuilders. Others were proposed but not built at all. Most are linked to a specific customer's name, such as the King Farouk, the Maharajas of Baroda and Mysore, as well as the Americans Briggs Cunningham and James Melton. It is evident that certain customers outside of the Royalty and Heads of State category believed that a Phantom IV would be available for purchase. Just how, or if, the news was broken to those customers that the firm would not supply a chassis for their proposed cars, or why they opted for other models, is open to conjecture.

By 1956, appropriate bodies for state use had been built on Silver Wraiths, making dedicated Phantom IV production no longer necessary. The model, which in spite of its luxury and exclusivity had not been very profitable, was discontinued, its role of expanding the prestige of Rolls-Royce having been achieved.

Table of all 18 units

References

Bibliography

External links

Videos

Rolls-Royce Phantom
Road transport of heads of state
Limousines
Cars introduced in 1950